A History of US is a ten-volume (and one sourcebook) historical book series for children, written by Joy Hakim and first published in its entirety in 1995. The series is published by the US branch of Oxford University Press and is currently in its third edition. Originally conceived as a trade children's series, the books quickly found fans among classroom teachers; in response to the prompting of educators Oxford University Press developed ancillary teaching materials to accompany the series. Branded as 'alternatives to traditional textbooks' the series is regularly used in both public and private schools, usually in middle school classes. The books are all written in a personal tone, as if the author were a storyteller. The texts have been released to ample praise by teachers, home-schoolers, students, and many others. The series has won the James A. Michener Award in Writing and the Parent's Choice Gold Award.

Content

The books are titled:

The First Americans: Prehistory–1600
Making Thirteen Colonies: 1600–1740
From Colonies to Country: 1735–1791
The New Nation: 1789–1850
Liberty for All? 1820–1860
War, Terrible War: 1855–1865
Reconstructing America: 1865–1890
An Age of Extremes: 1880–1917
War, Peace, And All That Jazz: 1918–1945
All the People: Since 1945

The eleventh volume is a sourcebook and index, containing full text of the primary sources—usually government documents, speeches, or famous writings—referenced throughout the series and words.

Reception
The series won the James A. Michener Award in Writing from the National Council of the Social Studies in 1997 and the Parents' Choice Gold Award in 1995 for a Reference book for ages 9–12. The series has sold millions of copies and was accepted as a textbook in several U.S. states. David McCullough, a Pulitzer Prize-winning author of history books, praised A History of US before a U.S. Senate subcommittee hearing in 2005.

Although it has received positive reviews from most people, some conservative critics have alleged that the works are politically-biased.

A series of reviews in 2000–2001 in The Textbook Letter, a publication of the Textbook League, criticized various aspects of the first two books of A History of US. In a review of volume 2, Making Thirteen Colonies: 1600–1740, Alice Whealey noted many claims regarding the history of Western civilization as erroneous, focusing on republicanism, Moorish Spain, and Abrahamic religious stories presented as fact. Also regarding volume 2, Earl Hautala wrote that Hakim's inclusion of the Bible stories of Abraham and Moses is unjustified and incorrect from both a Biblical and a non-Biblical perspective. William J. Bennetta argued that volume 1, The First Americans: Prehistory–1600, presented a politicized multicultural view of early history.  A Portland Oregon parent brought serious concerns to her school district regarding the dehumanizing portrayal of slaves and minimization of the suffering of Indigenous peoples during colonization in the text

Adaptation
A television miniseries titled Freedom: A History of US was aired on PBS in 2003.

Voice cast
Hosted by Katie Couric. the series featured an ensemble voice cast playing multiple historical and fictional characters throughout the show's run. The cast included:

References

External links 
Joy Hakim's official website
A History of US series page, from the Oxford University Press
Booknotes interview with Hakim on Freedom: A History of US, February 23, 2003.
Freedom: A History of US at the Internet Movie Database

History books about the United States
Series of children's books
Children's history books
Series of history books
American children's books
1995 children's books